Michael Pritchard is an American philosopher and the Willard A. Brown Emeritus Professor of Philosophy at Western Michigan University.

Books
 Englehardt, Elaine E.; Pritchard, Michael S. (eds.). Ethics across the curriculum—pedagogical perspectives. Cham: Springer-Verlag.
Charles Harris, Michael J. Rabins, Michael S. Pritchard. Engineering Ethics: Concepts and Cases
Lisa H. Newton, Elaine E. Englehardt, Michael S. Pritchard. Clashing Views in Business Ethics and Society
Michael S. Pritchard. Professional Integrity: Thinking Ethically (2006)
 Elaine E. Englehardt, Michael S. Pritchard, Kerry D. Romesburg, Brian Schrag. Ethical Challenges of Academic Administration, Springer 2009
 Philosophical Adventures with Children
 On Becoming Responsible
 Communication Ethics
 Reasonable Children

References

21st-century American philosophers
Philosophy academics
Western Michigan University faculty
Living people
1941 births